is a passenger railway station located in the city of Kami, Kōchi Prefecture, Japan. It is operated by JR Shikoku and has the station number "D38".

Lines

Layout
The station, which is unstaffed, consists of a side platform serving a single track. There is a shelter on the platform for waiting passengers. A ramp leads up to the platform from the access road.

Adjacent stations

History
The station opened on 27 January 1952 as a new station on the existing Dosan Line. At that time the station was operated by Japanese National Railways (JNR). With the privatization of JNR on 1 April 1987, control of the station passed to JR Shikoku.

Surrounding area
The station is located in a residential area.

See also
 List of Railway Stations in Japan

References

External links

 JR Shikoku timetable

Railway stations in Kōchi Prefecture
Railway stations in Japan opened in 1952
Kami, Kōchi